Carbohydrazide is the chemical compound with the formula OC(N2H3)2.  It is a white, water-soluble solid. It decomposes upon melting.  A number of carbazides are known where one or more N-H groups are replaced by other substituents.  They occur widely in the drugs, herbicides, plant growth regulators, and dyestuffs.

Production
Industrially the compound is produced by treatment of urea with hydrazine:
OC(NH2)2  +  2 N2H4   →   OC(N2H3)2 +  2 NH3  
It can also be prepared by reactions of other C1-precursors with hydrazine, such as carbonate esters. 
It can be prepared from phosgene, but this route cogenerates the hydrazinium salt [N2H5]Cl and results in some diformylation.  Carbazic acid is also a suitable precursor:
N2NH3CO2H  +  N2H4   →   OC(N2H3)2 + H2O

Structure
The molecule is nonplanar. All nitrogen centers are at least somewhat pyramidal, indicative of weaker C-N pi-bonding.  The C-N and C-O distances are about 1.36 and 1.25 Å, respectively.

Industrial uses
 Oxygen scrubber: carbohydrazide is used to remove oxygen in boiler systems. Oxygen scrubbers prevent corrosion.
 Precursor to polymers:  carbohydrazide can be used as a curing agent for epoxide-type resins.
 Photography: carbohydrazide is used in the silver halide diffusion process as one of the toners. Carbohydrazide is used to stabilize color developers that produce images of the azo-methine and azine classes.
 Carbohydrazide has been used to develop ammunition propellants, stabilize soaps, and is used as a reagent in organic synthesis.
 Salts of carbohydrazide, such as nitrate, dinitrate and perchlorate, can be used as secondary explosives. Complex salts of carbohydrazide, like bis(carbohydrazide)diperchloratocopper(II) and tris(carbohydrazide)nickel(II) perchlorate, can be used as primary explosives in laser detonators.

Hazards
Heating carbohydrazide may result in an explosion. Carbohydrazide is harmful if swallowed, irritating to eyes, respiratory system, and skin. Carbohydrazide is toxic to aquatic organisms.

References 

Cleaning product components
Hydrazides